Lin Huiqing (born 1941) also known as Lin Hui-ching is a former female international table tennis player from China.

Table tennis career
From 1965 to 1971 she won eight medals in singles, doubles, and team events in the World Table Tennis Championships.

The eight World Championship medals included five gold medals in the singles at the 1971 World Table Tennis Championships, the team event at the 1965 World Table Tennis Championships, the mixed doubles in 1971 with Zhang Xielin and two women's doubles title in 1965 and 1971 with Zheng Minzhi.

See also
 List of table tennis players
 List of World Table Tennis Championships medalists

References

Chinese female table tennis players
Living people
Sportspeople from Jakarta
Indonesian female table tennis players
Indonesian people of Chinese descent
Indonesian emigrants to China
1941 births